William Adipepe Pandi Bapaga (born 3 November 2002) is an English professional footballer of Congolese descent who plays as a midfielder for Coventry City.

Career
In July 2019, the 16-year-old Bapaga was announced as a surprise call-up from the youth side.

Bapaga made his professional debut coming on as a substitute on 10 August 2019 in a 0–0 League One draw with Bolton Wanderers, coming on to replace Zain Westbrooke.

On 12 August 2021, Bapaga signed for Grimsby Town on a season-long loan. On 12 January 2022, Bapaga was recalled by parent club Coventry City.

Career statistics

References

External links
Will Bapaga player profile at ccfc.co.uk

2002 births
Living people
Footballers from Coventry
English footballers
Association football midfielders
Coventry City F.C. players
Grimsby Town F.C. players
English Football League players
National League (English football) players